Bundoora is an electoral district of the Victorian Legislative Assembly. It also includes the central campus of La Trobe University. It lies within the Northern Metropolitan Region of the upper house, the Legislative Council.

Bundoora has been a safe seat for the Labor Party throughout its history. It was first contested in 1976, and was won by John Cain, son of former premier John Cain. He rapidly rose through the parliamentary ranks to become Labor leader in 1981 and premier himself in 1982. Cain was comfortably re-elected throughout the 1980s, resigned as premier in 1990, and retired as member for Bundoora at the 1992 election.

Cain was succeeded by Sherryl Garbutt, formerly the member for the abolished Greensborough. Garbutt served as a shadow minister in opposition from 1993 to 1999, and after Labor regained government at the 1999 election served as a minister in the first two terms of the Bracks government. She respectively served as Minister for Women's Affairs (1999-2002), Minister for Environment and Conservation (1999-2002) and Minister for Community Services (2002-2006), before retiring at the 2006 election.

Following Garbutt's retirement announcement in 2005, Minister for Sport and Recreation and Minister for the Commonwealth Games Justin Madden, who held a seat in the Legislative Council, initially sought and won preselection for Bundoora. However, in October 2006, the month before the 2006 state election, the sudden retirement of Northcote MP Mary Delahunty resulted in a three-way deal that saw Fiona Richardson nominate for Northcote instead of the Legislative Council, Madden take Richardson's former place on the Legislative Council ticket, and former City of Banyule mayor Colin Brooks stand in Bundoora. Brooks had earlier challenged Madden for Bundoora preselection, but had withdrawn his nomination. Brooks won the seat, and was easily re-elected in 2010 and 2014.

Members for Bundoora

Election results

References

External links
 Electorate profile: Bundoora District, Victorian Electoral Commission

Bundoora
1976 establishments in Australia
City of Darebin
City of Banyule
City of Whittlesea
Shire of Nillumbik
Electoral districts and divisions of Greater Melbourne